The Carpenter House in Valhalla, Westchester County, New York, is a pre-American Revolutionary War home that was the scene a skirmish with British troops on February 3, 1780.

On that date, a large British force attacked Joseph Young's house at Four Corners in Valhalla because an American force of about 250 soldiers, assigned to guard the area, had encamped nearby.  The British killed 14 Americans and took 90 prisoners.  The Carpenter house was their next target.  Located near the Young house, it sheltered several American soldiers recovering from smallpox.  The British forced all the sick men out into deep snow, causing their deaths.

In later years, the site of the house became part of the Westchester Community College campus, and it was demolished to make way for new construction.   Its eighteenth-century detached kitchen was incorporated into the Campbell house located just across Route 100 from the West Gate of the college. A nineteenth-century photograph of the kitchen is shown in the referenced source article.

References

Houses in Westchester County, New York
Buildings and structures demolished in the 1960s
1960s disestablishments in New York (state)